The Women's Chess World Cup 2021 was a 103-player single-elimination chess tournament that took place in Sochi, Russia, from 12 July to 3 August 2021. It was the inaugural edition of a women's-only version of the FIDE World Cup. The tournament was held in parallel with the Chess World Cup 2021, an open tournament.

The tournament formed part of the qualification for the Women's World Chess Championship 2022.  The top three finishers, other than Women's World Chess Champion Ju Wenjun and players who have otherwise qualified, qualified for the Women's Candidates Tournament 2022.

Format

The format is a 7-round knockout event. 78 women play one another in the first round. The 39 that go through are joined in the second round by the top 25 seeds, who are given a bye for the first round. The losers of the two semi-finals will play one another for third place.

Each round consists of two classical games with shorter tiebreaks as needed. Their time controls are as follows.

 Two classical time limit games: 90 minutes for the first 40 moves with 30 minutes added for the further moves. Increment per move is 30 seconds.
 If tied, two games of 25 minutes with 10 second increments per move.
 If tied, two games of 10 minutes with 10 second increments per move.
 If tied, two games of 5 minutes with 3 second increments per move.
 If the match is still tied, a single armageddon chess game is played to decide the match, with draw odds to Black, meaning White must win but Black only needs to draw or win, to win the match. The players draw lots and the winner of the draw chooses their color. White receives 5 minutes, Black receives 4 minutes, and each player receives an extra 2 seconds per move beginning at move 61.

Prize money 
The total prize fund was US$676,250, with the first prize of US$50,000.

Participants
The following was the list of participants. Players are seeded by their FIDE rating of June 2021.

 , GM, 2596 (E18)
 , GM, 2558 (WC) 
 , GM, 2544 (WC)
 , GM, 2535 (R)
 , GM, 2524 (E18)
 , GM, 2515 (R)
 , GM, 2511 (R)
 , IM, 2500 (AS19) 
 , IM, 2494 (E19)
 , IM, 2494 (Z3.1)
 , GM, 2491 (FN)
 , IM, 2489 (J19)
 , IM, 2473 (E18)
 , GM, 2472 (WC)
 , GM, 2472 (R)
 , GM, 2470 (E18)
 , WGM, 2469 (R)
 , GM, 2463 (PN)
 , GM, 2459 (E19)
 , IM, 2456 (E18)
 , WGM, 2448 (R)
 , IM, 2446 (E19)
 , IM, 2443 (E18)
 , IM, 2442 (PN)
 , IM, 2440 (FN)
 , GM, 2438 (E18)
 , GM, 2436 (E18) 
 , IM, 2430 (FN)
 , IM, 2430 (E18)
 , GM, 2429 (E18)
 , IM, 2428 (PN)
 , IM, 2421 (FN)
 , IM, 2418 (PN)
 , IM, 2418 (E18)
 , IM, 2417 (E18)
 , IM, 2413 (E19)
 , IM, 2413 (FN)
 , IM, 2413 (FN)
 , IM, 2411 (FN)
 , GM, 2407 (FN)
 , GM, 2404 (FN)
 , IM, 2404 (E18)
 , WGM, 2403 (E19)
 , WGM, 2399 (FN)
 , IM, 2395 (E19)
 , GM, 2393 (E19)
 , WGM, 2393 (FN)
 , IM, 2391 (Z3.7)
 , WGM, 2390 (J18)
 , IM, 2389 (FN)
 , WGM, 2388 (AM18)
 , IM, 2382 (FN)
 , IM, 2379 (E19)
 , IM, 2379 (E19)
 , IM, 2370 (AS18)
 , IM, 2369 (FN)
 , IM, 2363 (E18)
 , WGM, 2362 (FN)
 , IM, 2360 (Z3.3)
 , GM, 2358 (FN)
 , WGM, 2358 (Z2.1)
 , IM, 2357 (E19)
 , WGM, 2355 (FN)
 , IM, 2346 (FN)
 , WGM, 2344 (PN)
 , WGM, 2341 (E19)
 , WGM, 2339 (FN)
 , WGM, 2335 (FN)
 , WIM, 2323 (ON)
 , FM, 2321 (FN)
 , WIM, 2317 (FN)
 , WGM, 2316 (Z2.1)
 , WGM, 2309 (E19)
 , WGM, 2301 (E19)
 , WGM, 2299 (Z3.6)
 , WIM, 2278 (FN)
 , WIM, 2276 (PN)
 , WIM, 2273 (Z3.4)
 , WIM, 2262 (Z2.3)
 , WGM, 2257 (AM19)
 , WGM, 2256 (E19)
 , WGM, 2229 (FN)
 , WIM, 2201 (FN)
 , WIM, 2191 (FN)
 , WIM, 2189 (FN)
 , WFM, 2182 (FN)
 , WGM, 2182 (AF)
 , WGM, 2179 (FN)
 , WIM, 2170 (Z2.5)
 , WGM, 2106 (FN)
 , WIM, 2083 (FN)
 , WIM, 2076 (AF)
 , WIM, 2072 (FN)
 , WIM, 2071 (Z2.2)
 , WGM, 2071 (PN)
 , WFM, 2061 (FN)
 , WIM, 2046 (FN)
 , WFM, 2035 (FN)
 , WIM, 2015 (AF)
 , WIM, 2013 (Z2.3)
 , WIM, 2009 (Z3.2)
 , WIM, 1863 (PN)
 , 1835 (FN)

Qualification paths

WC: Semifinalists of the Women's World Chess Championship 2018
J18 and J19: World Junior Champions 2018 and 2019
R: Rating
E18 and E19: European Individual Championships 2018 and 2019
AM18 and AM19: American Continental Chess Championship 2018 and 2019
AS18 and AS19: Asian Chess Championship 2018 and 2019

AF: African Chess Championship 2019
Z2.1, Z2.2, Z2.3, Z2.4, Z2.5, Z3.1, Z3.2, Z3.3, Z3.4, Z3.6, Z3.7: Zonal tournaments
FN: Federation's nominee
ON: Organiser's nominee
PN: FIDE President's nominee

Replacements
The following are the players from the list of qualifiers who declined to play, and their replacements:
  (WC) →  (R)
  (R) →  (R)
  (R) →  (R)
  (Z3.5) → an extra presidential nominee (PN)
  (Z3.5) → an extra presidential nominee (PN)
  (Z3.5) → an extra presidential nominee (PN)
  (Z3.5) → an extra presidential nominee (PN)

In addition, three federations (China, Saudi Arabia, Vietnam) did not nominate a player.

Results

Due to the size of the bracket, the results view is made up of two parts on this page. Rounds one through four are shown first, split up into different sections of the bracket. They then join again for the quarterfinals and beyond, which are shown afterwards.

Rounds 1-4

Section 1

Section 2

Section 3

Section 4

Section 5

Section 6

Section 7

Section 8

Rounds 5-7

Third place

Finals

See also
 Chess World Cup 2021
 Women's World Chess Championship

References

External links
 FIDE World Cup 2021, official site, FIDE.

Chess World Cup
Chess World Cup
Chess in Russia
Chess World Cup
Chess World Cup
Chess World Cup
Women's chess competitions